Colorado Adventure is a mine train roller coaster located at Phantasialand in Brühl, North Rhine-Westphalia, Germany. During construction, it was decided to opt for a roller coaster in a Western style rather than a traditional roller coaster. The name Colorado is derived from the U.S. state of the same name, well known during the ‘Wild West’ period in the USA.

The ride has been voted by fans as one of the world’s best examples of the mine roller coaster. Until 2013 its full name was Colorado Adventure – The Michael Jackson Thrill Ride. The ride was open from the beginning of the 1996 season and was ‘officially’ opened by Michael Jackson on May 11. 

Colorado Adventure has five trains, each with six cars for a total of 32 passengers. The first car is designed as a locomotive and offers two seats. The other cars all have three rows for a total of six people and a maximum of four trains can be used at one time. 

Local residents have complained about the amount of noise generated by riders on the Colorado Adventure. The ride has been fitted with extra tunnel sections and also partly covered with noise barriers. In 2011, the Smokey Mountain was replaced by a new child attraction "Tikal".

References

External links 
Roller Coaster Database: https://rcdb.com/978.htm

Roller coasters in Germany
Roller coasters introduced in 1996
Western (genre) amusement rides